Jufrud may refer to:
 Jufrud, Gilan
 Jufrud, South Khorasan